Simon Whatley (born 25 February 1973 in Yeovil, Somerset) is a retired English professional darts player who plays in the Professional Darts Corporation events.

Career

He began with a very good 2002 campaign, reaching the quarter-finals of the Las Vegas Desert Classic, beating Dennis Smith in the last 16, losing to Lee Palfreyman. The same year he played in the Winmau World Masters, a BDO major, beating 1997 Masters champion Graham Hunt in the first round, before losing to Ronnie Baxter. He then joined the PDC full-time and played in the 2003 UK Open, reaching the last 32 stage by beating Barrie Bates and losing to Shayne Burgess who was runner-up to Phil Taylor. He also played in the 2003 World Matchplay, losing in the first round to Jamie Harvey. He rounded off a good year by playing in the 2004 PDC World Darts Championship, defeating Henry O'Neill, former World Champion Richie Burnett and Lionel Sams to reach the quarter-finals, losing to Wayne Mardle. His follow-up year was disappointing, suffering an early exit at the 2004 UK Open, losing to Andy Keen in the second round, followed by a second first-round exit at the World Matchplay, losing to Alan Warriner. He played at the 2005 PDC World Darts Championship, but lost in the second round to Mark Holden. He then had a poor run of form which him fail to progress in the major tournaments and drop outside the top 100 as a result. However he hit back to form in the 2008 UK Open, reaching the last 16 of the tournament and climb up to 79 in the world rankings.

World Championship Results

PDC

 2004: Quarter Finals (lost to Wayne Mardle 1–5)
 2005: 2nd Round (lost to Mark Holden 0–3)

External links
 Profile and stats on Darts Database

1973 births
English darts players
Living people
People from Yeovil
British Darts Organisation players
Professional Darts Corporation former pro tour players